Meyer Francis Nimkoff (1904-1965) was an American sociologist and Professor at Boston University. He was the editor of Journal of Marriage and Family Living (now the Journal of Marriage and Family).

Books
 The Family, 1934
 The Child, 1934
 Parent-Child Relationships, 1935
 Marriage and the Family, 1947
 Comparative family systems, 1965
 Sociology, 1940 (published as A handbook of sociology in 1947)
 Technology and the changing family, 1955
 Technology and Social Change, 1957

References 

American sociologists
1904 births
1965 deaths
Boston University faculty